Gregory Eric "Greg" Kelley (May 19, 1944 – February 15, 1961) was an American figure skater who competed in men's singles.  He won the junior title at the 1959 U.S. Figure Skating Championships and finished ninth at the 1960 World Figure Skating Championships after the top three U.S. skaters skipped the event.  In 1961, he won the silver medal at the U.S. Nationals and the bronze at the North American Figure Skating Championships.

Kelley was the youngest of six siblings. His parents were Dr. Vincent Kelley, who was a top surgeon in Boston, and his wife Nathalie. Kelley began skating at age eight after attending a learn-to-skate program at Boston's skating club. Aside from his figure skating career, Kelley's ambition was to be a doctor like his father.

Kelley was en route to the World Championships in 1961 when his plane (Sabena Flight 548) crashed near Brussels, Belgium, killing all on board.  He was 16 at the time of his death.  His 28-year-old sister, Nathalie, was also killed in the crash.

Competitive highlights

 N = Novice level; J = Junior level

External links
 
 "Skater Gregory Kelley and Sister Eulogized at Newton Funeral", clipping from The Boston Globe
 U.S. Figure Skating biography (archived at Wayback Machine, September 7, 2015)
 Remembering Flight 548: Shattered dreams (archived at Wayback Machine, February 23, 2010)

American male single skaters
1944 births
1961 deaths
Victims of aviation accidents or incidents in Belgium
Victims of aviation accidents or incidents in 1961
20th-century American people